The 20th PMPC Star Awards for Television ceremony was held at the UP Theater, Quezon City on October 23, 2006 and broadcast over RPN Channel 9 on October 28, 2006. The ceremony was hosted by Boy Abunda, Tin Tin Bersola-Babao, Jean Garcia, Toni Gonzaga and Joey Marquez and directed by Ding Bolanos.

Nominees and Winners 
These are the nominations for the 20th Star Awards for Television. The winners are in bold.

Best TV station 
ABS-CBN-2
NBN-4
ABC-5
GMA-7
RPN-9
QTV-11
IBC-13
Studio 23

Best Primetime Drama Series 
Encantadia (GMA 7)
Gulong ng Palad (ABS-CBN 2)
Ikaw ang Lahat sa Akin (ABS-CBN 2)
Majika (GMA 7)
Sa Piling Mo (ABS-CBN 2)
Vietnam Rose (ABS-CBN 2)

Best Daytime Drama Series 
Agawin Mo Man Ang Lahat (GMA 7)
Daisy Siete (GMA 7)
Kung Mamahalin Mo Lang Ako (GMA 7)
Now and Forever (GMA 7)

Best Drama Actor 
John Lloyd Cruz (Ikaw ang Lahat sa Akin / ABS-CBN 2)
Christopher de Leon (Now and Forever: Agos / GMA 7)
John Estrada (Vietnam Rose / ABS-CBN 2)
Albert Martinez (Sa Piling Mo / ABS-CBN 2)
Diether Ocampo (Ikaw ang Lahat sa Akin / ABS-CBN 2)
Piolo Pascual (Sa Piling Mo / ABS-CBN 2)
Dennis Trillo (Now and Forever: Agos / GMA 7)

Best Drama Actress 
Claudine Barretto (Ikaw ang Lahat sa Akin / ABS-CBN 2)
Sunshine Dizon (Encantadia / GMA 7)
Cherie Gil (Gulong ng Palad / ABS-CBN 2)
Angel Locsin (Majika / GMA 7)
Rica Peralejo (Sa Piling Mo / ABS-CBN 2)
Judy Ann Santos (Sa Piling Mo / ABS-CBN 2)
Maricel Soriano (Vietnam Rose / ABS-CBN 2)

Best Drama Anthology 
Maalaala Mo Kaya (ABS-CBN 2)
Magpakailanman (GMA 7)
Maynila (GMA 7)

Best Single Performance by an Actress 
Glaiza de Castro (Maalaala Mo Kaya: Rosaryo / ABS-CBN 2)
Alessandra de Rossi (Magpakailanman: Pag-Ahon sa Lusak / GMA 7)
Gloria Diaz (Maalaala Mo Kaya: Radyo / ABS-CBN 2)
Jean Garcia (Magpakailanman: Kalbaryo ng Isang Ina / GMA 7)
Maja Salvador (Maalaala Mo Kaya: Regalo / ABS-CBN 2)
Judy Ann Santos (Maalaala Mo Kaya: Rosaryo / ABS-CBN 2)
Vilma Santos (Maalaala Mo Kaya: Regalo / ABS-CBN 2)

Best Single Performance by an Actor 
Carlo Aquino (Maalaala Mo Kaya: Scapular / ABS-CBN 2)
John Lloyd Cruz (Maalaala Mo Kaya: Greeting Card / ABS-CBN 2)
Christopher de Leon (Maalaala Mo Kaya: Palamig / ABS-CBN 2)
Jhong Hilario (Maalaala Mo Kaya: Bangka / ABS-CBN 2)
Jeremy Marquez (Magpakailanman: Pag-Ahon sa Lusak / GMA 7)

Best New Male TV Personality 
Chuck Allie (Love to Love / GMA 7)
Marky Cielo (Encantadia: Pag-ibig Hanggang Wakas / GMA 7)
Franzen Fajardo (Your Song: Narda / ABS-CBN 2)
Aldred Gatchalian (ASAP '06 / ABS-CBN 2)
Angelo Ilagan (Mga Anghel na Walang Langit / ABS-CBN 2)
Sam Milby (ASAP '06 / ABS-CBN 2)
Makisig Morales (Little Big Star / ABS-CBN 2)
Gerald Santos (SOP Rules / GMA 7)

Best New Female TV Personality
Iwa Moto (Love to Love / GMA 7)
Raquel Reyes (Mga Anghel na Walang Langit / ABS-CBN 2)
Jackie Rice (Love to Love / GMA 7)
Marian Rivera (Kung Aagawin Mo Man Ang Lahat / GMA 7)
Nene Tamayo (TV Patrol World / ABS-CBN 2)
Princess Violago (S-Files / GMA 7)

Best Gag Show 
Bitoy's Funniest Videos (GMA 7)
Bubble Gang (GMA 7)
Goin' Bulilit (ABS-CBN 2)
Nuts Entertainment (GMA 7)
Wazzup Wazzup (Studio 23)

Best Comedy Show 
Ay, Robot! (QTV 11)
Bahay Mo Ba 'To? (GMA 7)
Daddy Di Do Du (GMA 7)
Hokus Pokus (GMA 7)
Lagot Ka, Isusumbong Kita (GMA 7)
OK Fine, 'To Ang Gusto Nyo! (ABS-CBN 2)

Best Comedy Actor 
Ogie Alcasid (Bubble Gang / GMA 7)
Joey de Leon (Nuts Entertainment / GMA 7)
Keempee de Leon (Bahay Mo Ba 'To? / GMA 7)
Dolphy (Quizon Avenue / ABS-CBN 2)
Edu Manzano (OK Fine, 'To Ang Gusto Nyo! / ABS-CBN 2)
Roderick Paulate (Bora / ABS-CBN 2)
Vic Sotto (Daddy Di Do Du / GMA 7)
Michael V. (Bitoy's Funniest Videos / GMA 7)
Ronaldo Valdez (Bahay Mo Ba 'To? / GMA 7)

Best Comedy Actress 
K Brosas (Hokus Pokus / GMA 7)
Ai-Ai de las Alas (My Juan and Only / ABS-CBN 2)
Toni Gonzaga (Wazzup Wazzup / Studio 23)
Ara Mina (Bubble Gang / GMA 7)
Pokwang (Quizon Avenue / ABS-CBN 2)
Tiya Pusit (Bahay Mo Ba 'To? / GMA 7)
Rufa Mae Quinto (Hokus Pokus / GMA 7)
Gloria Romero (OK Fine, 'To Ang Gusto Nyo! / ABS-CBN 2)

Best Musical Variety Show 
ASAP '06 (ABS-CBN 2)
ASAP Fanatic (ABS-CBN 2)
SOP Gigsters (GMA 7)
SOP Rules (GMA 7)
Walang Tulugan with the Master Showman (GMA 7)

Best Variety Show 
Chowtime Na! (IBC 13)
Eat Bulaga! (GMA 7)
Gets Mo? Gets Ko! (IBC 13)
SMS: Sunday Mall Show (IBC 13)
Wowowee (ABS-CBN 2)

Best Female TV Host 
Toni Gonzaga (ASAP '06 / ABS-CBN 2)
Pia Guanio (Eat Bulaga! / GMA 7)
Jaya (SOP Rules / GMA 7)
Zsa Zsa Padilla (ASAP '06 / ABS-CBN 2)
Regine Velasquez (SOP Rules / GMA 7)

Best Male TV Host 
Ogie Alcasid (SOP Rules / GMA 7)
Joey de Leon (Eat Bulaga! / GMA 7)
Raymond Gutierrez (SOP Gigsters / GMA 7)
Luis Manzano (ASAP '06 / ABS-CBN 2)
German Moreno (Walang Tulugan with the Master Showman / GMA 7)
Willie Revillame (Wowowee / ABS-CBN 2)
Vic Sotto (Eat Bulaga! / GMA 7)
Gary Valenciano (ASAP '06 / ABS-CBN 2)

Best Public Service Program 
Bitag (IBC 13)
Emergency (GMA 7)
Imbestigador (GMA 7)
S.O.C.O. (Scene of the Crime Operatives) (ABS-CBN 2)
S.O.S.: Stories of Survival (ABC 5)
Wish Ko Lang (GMA 7)
XXX: Exklusibong, Explosibong, Exposé (ABS-CBN 2)

Best Public Service Program Host 
Gus Abelgas (S.O.C.O. (Scene of the Crime Operatives) / ABS-CBN 2)
Martin Andanar (S.O.S.: Stories of Survival / ABC 5)
Julius Babao, Karen Davila, and Henry Omaga-Diaz (XXX: Exklusibong, Explosibong, Exposé / ABS-CBN 2)
Arnold Clavio (Emergency / GMA 7)
Mike Enriquez (Imbestigador / GMA 7)
Vicky Morales (Wish Ko Lang / GMA 7)
Ben Tulfo (Bitag / IBC 13)

Best Horror-Fantasy Program 
Ang Mahiwagang Baul (GMA 7)
Komiks (ABS-CBN 2)
Nginiig (ABS-CBN 2)
Wag Kukurap (GMA 7)

Best Reality Competition Program 
Chow Time: Conquest (IBC 13)
Extra Challenge (GMA 7)
May Trabaho Ka! (QTV 11)
Totoo TV (ABC 5)

Best Reality Competition Program Host 
Paolo Abrera and Mariz Umali (May Trabaho Ka! / QTV 11)
Paolo Bediones and Ethel Booba (Extra Challenge / GMA 7)
Maverick Relova and Ariel Villasanta (Totoo TV / ABC 5)
Vanessa Untalan (Chow Time: Conquest / IBC 13)

Best Game Show 
All Star K!: The P1 Million Videoke Challenge (GMA 7)
Blind Item (ABC 5)
Now Na! (QTV 11)
Pilipinas, Game KNB? (ABS-CBN 2)

Best Game Show Host 
Kris Aquino (Pilipinas, Game KNB? / ABS-CBN 2)
Arnel Ignacio (Now Na! / QTV 11)
Jaya and Allan K. (All-Star K: The P1 Million Videoke Challenge / GMA 7)
John Lapus (Blind Item / ABC 5)

Best Talent Search Program 
Little Big Star (ABS-CBN 2)
Pinoy Pop Superstar (GMA 7)
StarStruck: The Nationwide Invasion (GMA 7)
Shall We Dance? (ABC 5)

Best Talent Search Program Host 
Dingdong Dantes, Raymond Gutierrez and Jolina Magdangal (StarStruck: The Nationwide Invasion / GMA 7)
Sarah Geronimo (Little Big Superstar / ABS-CBN 2)
Dominic Ochoa and Lucy Torres-Gomez (Shall We Dance? / ABC 5)
Regine Velasquez (Pinoy Pop Superstar / GMA 7)

Best Youth Oriented Program 
Let's Go (ABS-CBN 2)
Love to Love (GMA 7)
POSH (Q 11)
Your Song (ABS-CBN 2)

Best Educational Program 
Island Flavors (ABC 5)
Ka-Toque: Lutong Barkada (Q 11)
Kumikitang Kabuhayan (ABS-CBN 2)
Makuha Ka sa Tikim (ABS-CBN 2)
Mobile Kusina (GMA 7)

Best Educational Program Host 
Gigi Angkaw (Island Flavors / ABC 5)
Rosebud Benitez, JL Cang, Niño Logarta, Darlo Lopez, Mitchie Sison and Jonah Trinidad (Ka-Toque: Lutong Barkada / QTV 11)
Eugene Domingo, Jean Garcia and Eula Valdez (Makuha Ka sa Tikim / ABS-CBN 2)
Christine Jacob (Mobile Kusina / GMA 7)
Donita Rose (Mobile Kusina / GMA 7)

Best Celebrity Talk Show 
Homeboy (ABS-CBN 2)
Mel and Joey (GMA 7)
Moms (Q 11)
Sharon (ABS-CBN 2)
Sis (GMA 7)

Best Celebrity Talk Show Host 
Boy Abunda (Homeboy / ABS-CBN 2)
Sharon Cuneta (Sharon / ABS-CBN 2)
Gelli de Belen, Janice de Belen, and Carmina Villaroel (Sis / GMA 7)
Joey de Leon and Mel Tiangco (Mel and Joey / GMA 7)
Lani Mercado, Manilyn Reynes and Sherilyn Reyes (Moms / Q 11)

Best Documentary Program 
The Correspondents (ABS-CBN 2)
Dokyu: Ang Bagong Mata ng Documentaries (ABC 5)
i-Witness (GMA 7)
Probe (ABS-CBN 2)

Best Documentary Program Host 
Sandra Aguinaldo, Kara David, Howie Severino and Jay Taruc (i-Witness / GMA 7)
Karen Davila and Abner Mercado (The Correspondents / ABS-CBN 2)
Cheche Lazaro (Probe / ABS-CBN 2)

Best Magazine Show 
Kapuso Mo, Jessica Soho (GMA 7)
Kontrobersyal (ABS-CBN 2)
Pipol (ABS-CBN 2)
Rated K (ABS-CBN 2)
Real Stories: Kasama si Loren (ABC 5)
Reporter's Notebook (GMA 7)

Best Magazine Show Host 
Boy Abunda (Kontrobersyal / ABS-CBN 2)
Ces Oreña-Drilon (Pipol / ABS-CBN 2)
Jiggy Manicad and Maki Pulido (Reporter's Notebook / GMA 7)
Korina Sanchez (Rated K / ABS-CBN 2)
Jessica Soho (Kapuso Mo, Jessica Soho / GMA 7)

Best News Program 
24 Oras (GMA 7)
Big News (ABC 5)
IBC Express Balita (IBC 13)
NewsWatch Now (RPN 9)
Saksi (GMA 7)
Teledyaryo Sabado (NBN 4)
TV Patrol World (ABS-CBN 2)

Best Male Newscaster 
Ali Atienza (IBC Express Balita / IBC 13)
Julius Babao (TV Patrol World / ABS-CBN 2)
Arnold Clavio (Saksi / GMA 7)
Mike Enriquez (24 Oras / GMA 7)
Ted Failon (TV Patrol World / ABS-CBN 2)
Ivan Mayrina (News on Q / Q 11)
Buddy Oberas (Teledyaryo Sabado/ NBN 4)

Best Female Newscaster 
Pia Arcangel (Balitanghali / QTV 11)
Karen Davila (TV Patrol World / ABS-CBN 2)
Precious Hipolito (IBC Express Balita / IBC 13)
Vicky Morales (Saksi / GMA 7)
Korina Sanchez (Bandila / ABS-CBN 2)
Rhea Santos (News on Q / QTV 11)
Bernadette Sembrano (Insider / ABS-CBN 2)
Mel Tiangco (24 Oras / ABS-CBN 2)

Best Morning Show 
Breakfast (Studio 23)
Magandang Umaga, Pilipinas (ABS-CBN 2)
The Morning Show (NBN 4)
Unang Hirit (GMA 7)

Best Morning Show Host 
Bam Aquino, Mariton Pacheco and Company (Breakfast / Studio 23)
Julius Babao, Tin Tin Bersola-Babao, Bernadette Sembrano and Company (Magandang Umaga, Pilipinas / ABS-CBN 2)
Snow Badua, Veronica Baluyot-Jimenez, Stefanie Cueva, Bobby Guanzon and William Tiu (The Morning Show / NBN 4)
Lyn Ching, Arnold Clavio, Susie Entrata-Abrera, Jolina Magdangal, Regine Tolentino and Company (Unang Hirit / GMA 7)

Best Public Affairs Program 
Debate with Mare at Pare (GMA 7)
Dong Puno Live (ABS-CBN 2)
Up Close and Personal (IBC 13)
Y Speak (Studio 23)

Best Public Affairs Program Host 
Ryan Agoncillo and Bianca Gonzalez (Y Speak / Studio 23)
Marissa del Mar (Up Close and Personal / IBC 13)
Winnie Monsod and Oscar Orbos (Debate with Mare at Pare / GMA 7)
Dong Puno (Dong Puno Live/ABS-CBN 2)

Best Showbiz Oriented Talk Show 
The Buzz (ABS-CBN 2)
Entertainment Konek (ABS-CBN 2)
S-Files (GMA 7)
Showbiz Stripped (GMA 7)
Startalk (GMA 7)

Best Male Showbiz Oriented Talk Show Host 
Boy Abunda (The Buzz / ABS-CBN 2)
Paolo Bediones (S-Files / GMA 7)
Joey de Leon (Startalk / GMA 7)
Richard Gomez (S-Files / GMA 7)
Ricky Lo (Showbiz Stripped / GMA 7)

Best Female Showbiz Oriented Talk Show Host 
Kris Aquino (The Buzz / ABS-CBN 2)
Cristy Fermin (The Buzz / ABS-CBN 2)
Toni Gonzaga (Entertainment Konek / ABS-CBN 2)
Pia Guanio (S-Files / GMA 7)

Best Children Show 
Art Angel (GMA 7)
Art Jam (ABS-CBN 2)
Kids TV (ABC 5)

Best Children Show Host 
Pia Arcangel (Art Angel / GMA 7)
Maxine, Joyrose Romina and Yuuki (Kids TV / ABC 5)
Jeffrey Quizon (Art Jam / ABS-CBN 2)

Best Travel Show 
Pinoy Abroad (GMA 7)
Team Explorer (Studio 23)
Trip na Trip (ABS-CBN 2)
Travel Time (Studio 23)
WOW: What’s On Weekend (RPN 9)

Best Travel Show Host 
Susan Calo-Medina and Lui Villaruz (Travel Time / Studio 23)
Katherine de Castro and Franzen Fajardo (Trip na Trip / ABS-CBN 2)
Joel Mendez (WOW: What’s On Weekend / RPN 9)
Ivan Mayrina and Rhea Santos (Pinoy Abroad / GMA 7)
 Lui Villaruz (Team Explorer / Studio 23)

Best Lifestyle Show 
At Home Ka Dito (ABS-CBN 2)
Gandang Ricky Reyes (QTV 11)
The Good Life with Cory Quirino (Studio 23)
Kay Susan Tayo (GMA 7)
Tahanang Pinoy (ABC 5)

Best Lifestyle Show Host 
Aissa Gonzales, RJ Ledesma and Gelo Manosa (Tahanang Pinoy / ABC 5)
Susan Enriquez (Kay Susan Tayo / GMA 7)
Charlene Gonzales (At Home Ka Dito / ABS-CBN 2)
Cory Quirino The Good Life with Cory Quirino / Studio 23)
Ricky Reyes (Gandang Ricky Reyes / QTV 11)

Special awards

Ading Fernando Lifetime Achievement Awardee 
Eddie Mercado

Excellence in Broadcasting Awardee 
Harry Gasser

Faces of the Night 
John Estrada (Male)
Bettina Carlos (Female)

Stars of the Night 
Bob dela Cruz (Male)
Ethel Booba (Female)

See also 
PMPC Star Awards for TV

References 

PMPC Star Awards for Television